Philometra gerrei is a species of parasitic nematode of fishes, infecting the gonads of marine perciform fishes off the eastern Indian coast. It was first found in the whipfin silver-biddy, Gerres filamentosus. It is distinguished from its cogenerates by the gubernaculum structure in males, as well as the shape and structure of the females' cephalic and caudal ends, and their oesophagus.

References

Further reading
Moravec, František, and Atheer Ali. "Philometra johnii sp. nov.(Nematoda, Philometridae), a new gonad-infecting philometrid from the sin croaker Johnius dussumieri (Cuvier)(Perciformes, Sciaenidae) from marine waters of Iraq." Acta Parasitologica 58.3 (2013): 263-268.

External links
WORMS

Camallanida
Parasitic nematodes of fish
Nematodes described in 2013